is a former Japanese football manager. He last managed Samut Prakan City.

References

External links

1974 births
Living people
Japanese football managers
Japanese expatriate football managers
Tetsuya Murayama
Association football people from Tokyo